Psycho is the second full-length studio album by American electronicore band That's Outrageous!. The album was released on October 16, 2012 through inVogue Records.

Track listing

Personnel
 That's Outrageous!
 John Easterly – unclean vocals
 Tom DeGrazia – clean vocals, synthesizers, keyboards
 Joe Jensen - guitar
 Jonah Telyas - guitar
 Kyle Hulett - bass guitar
 Mike Ehmann - drums

 Production
 Tom DeGrazia – Producer, Mixing, Composer, Mastering, Engineer

References

2012 albums
InVogue Records albums
That's Outrageous! albums